Rob Beschizza is a British-American writer, artist and journalist, the editor of the culture website Boing Boing and the founder of txt.fyi, a publishing platform described by Wired as an example of "antisocial media". His works include minimalist video games, short stories, generative software that produces psychedelic art, wine descriptions, and journalistic euphemisms, among other subjects. Beschizza has appeared as a news commentator on television networks including NBC, CNN and Al Jazeera.

Beschizza, formerly a technology correspondent and a crime reporter, is a graduate of Goldsmiths College and became a naturalized US citizen in 2015.

In 2014, Beschizza produced an unauthorized edit of David Lynch's 1984 motion picture Dune with the dialogue systematically removed, which was itself taken down after a copyright claim.

References

External links
 
 Profile at Muckrack
 2017 interview with Rob Beschizza
 2015 Interview with Rob Beschizza

Living people
American male bloggers
American bloggers
British bloggers
Alumni of Goldsmiths, University of London
21st-century American non-fiction writers
Year of birth missing (living people)